Mary Teresa Hayden (1862 – 12 July 1942) was an Irish historian, Irish-language activist and campaigner for women's causes.

Biography
Mary Hayden was educated initially at the Dominican College, Eccles Street and then at Alexandra College in Dublin. She attended the Royal University of Ireland where she graduated with a BA (1885) and an MA (1887) in Modern Languages. With Agnes O'Farrelly she campaigned for women's rights in the university.

A campaigner for gender equality and noted as a public speaker, she was a prominent member of the Dublin Women's Suffrage Association. She was a member of the Gaelic League and friends with Padraig Pearse. However, she opposed violence and disapproved of the 1916 Easter Rising.

In 1911 she was elected to the senate of the National University of Ireland and in 1915 was appointed Professor of History at University College Dublin, a position she retained until her death.

Hayden worked with Mary Gwynn to establish the Irish Catholic Women's Suffrage Association (ICWSA) in 1915.

She helped to form the Women's Social and Progressive League as a political party committed to opposing the 1937 Constitution of Ireland and any regressive consequences it would entail.  She opposed articles 40, 41, and 45 concerning the status of women.

A biography of Hayden Mary Hayden: Irish Historian and Feminist by Joyce Padbury was published by Arlen House in 2020.

Publications
 A Short History of the Irish People by Mary Hayden and George Moonan(1921)
 Diaries of Mary Hayden 1878–1903 edited by Conan Kennedy (National Library of Ireland/Morrigan, 2008)
 The Mysterious Mary H. : A Selection of Writings by Mary Hayden (1862–1942) (Morrigan Books, 2008).

References

1862 births
1942 deaths
Alumni of the Royal University of Ireland
Academics of University College Dublin
20th-century Irish historians
Irish women non-fiction writers
People educated at Alexandra College
Irish women's rights activists
Irish language activists
Women historians
Irish suffragists